El Tambo District is one of twenty-eight districts of the province Huancayo in Peru.

Notable people
Tongo (entertainer), born José Abelardo Gutiérrez Alanya (1957), singer and humorist

See also 
 Ankap Wachanan
 Putkaqucha
 Waytapallana mountain range

References